The 2012 Hassanal Bolkiah Trophy was the fourth edition of the invitational tournament hosted by Brunei. The tournament took place in Brunei between 25 February and 5 March 2012. The competition is for players under the age of 22 and is being held only for the fourth time after 2002, 2005 and 2007. The tournament was not held in 2009 following the suspension imposed on the Brunei Amateur Football Association (BAFA) by FIFA. The organisers of the Hassanal Bolkiah Trophy 2012 have offered US$15,500 as reward for the champions. Originally, all ASEAN teams were supposed to participate at Hassanal Bolkiah Trophy 2012 (HBT 2012). However, Thailand eventually withdrew before any match were played.

Brunei emerged as the champion after beating Indonesia by 2–0 in the final, while both Myanmar and Vietnam shared the third place.

Venues

Officials 
Eight referees and ten assistants were selected for the tournament:

Match Commissioner & Referee Assessor

Squads 

Each nation had to submit a squad of 20 players, two of whom have to be goalkeepers, by 17 February 2012.

Group stage 
 All times are Brunei Darussalam Time (BNT) – UTC+8.

Tie-breaking criteria 
The teams are ranked according to points (3 points for a win, 1 point for a tie, 0 points for a loss) and tie breakers are in following order:
 Greater number of points obtained in the group matches between the teams concerned;
 Goal difference resulting from the group matches between the teams concerned;
 Greater number of goals scored in the group matches between the teams concerned;
 Result of direct matches;
 Drawing of lots.

Group A

Group B

Knockout stage

Semi-finals

Final

Goalscorers 
6 goals
  Kyaw Zayar Win

5 goals

  Adi Said
  Andik Vermansyah

3 goals

  Aminuddin Zakwan Tahir
  Kyaw Ko Ko

2 goals

  Sitthideth Khanthavong
  Soukaphone Vongchiengkham
  Thet Naing
  Angelo Verheye

1 goal

  Hendra Azam Idris
  Najib Tarif
  Nur Ikhwan Othman
  Azwan Ali Rahman
  Chan Vathanaka
  Chhun Sothearath
  Prak Mony Udom
  Teab Vathanak
  Miko Ardianto
  Nurmufid Fastabiqul Khoirot
  Yosua Pahabol
  Keoviengpheth Lithideth
  Mohamad Yazid Zaini
  Mohd Ridzuan Abdunloh
  Wan Ahmad Amirzafran
  Kaung Sithu
  Mai Aih Naing
  Thein Than Win
  Yan Aung Win
  Marvin Angeles
  Joshua Beloya
  Dong Junming
  Mohd Farris Ramlee
  Muhammad Shamil Sharif
  Diogo Rangel
  Januario Da Costa
  Jorge Manuel Alves
  Cao Xuân Thắng
  Đào Duy Khánh
  Nguyễn Xuân Nam
  Phạm Hoàng Lâm
  Phan Đình Thắng
  Quế Ngọc Hải

Own goal
  Keoviengpheth Lithideth (for Indonesia)
  Gan Jay Han (for Brunei)

Team statistics 
As per statistical convention in football, matches decided in extra time are counted as wins and losses, while matches decided by penalty shoot-outs are counted as draws.

References

External links 
 2012 Results

 
2012 in Asian football

2002
2012 in Brunei football
2012 in Burmese football
2012 in Malaysian football
2012 in Philippine football
2012 in Laotian football
2012 in Vietnamese football
2012 in Singaporean football
2012 in Cambodian football
2011–12 in Indonesian football
2012 in East Timorese sport